Demetrius M. Douglas (born June 8, 1967) is a Democratic member of the Georgia House of Representatives, serving since 2013. Douglas was a linebacker for the University of Georgia Bulldogs. He also played briefly in the NFL and CFL. Douglas is currently a mortgage broker and high school football coach.

Douglas signed with the New York Jets in May 1990 for the team's 1990 season but was soon released. He then signed with the Calgary Stampeders for two years. Douglas finally moved to the Washington Redskins, but suffered an ankle injury on the second day of practice.

References

External links
 
Legislative page

Living people
Democratic Party members of the Georgia House of Representatives
Georgia Bulldogs football players
Players of American football from Georgia (U.S. state)
Sportspeople from the Atlanta metropolitan area
People from Stockbridge, Georgia
21st-century American politicians
1967 births